or Ōkubo Hikozaemon (大久保 彦左衛門) (1560 – April 2, 1639) was a Japanese warrior in the Sengoku and Edo periods. He was the eighth son of Ōkubo Tadakazu, a vassal of the Tokugawa clan.

Biography
Tadataka was born in Kamiwada, Mikawa Province, the son of Tokugawa retainer Ōkubo Tadakazu. His older brother was Ōkubo Tadayo. He joined Tadayo at age 17 for his first campaign, during the subjugation of Tōtōmi Province. Tadataka's first battle was the siege of Inui Castle. From then on, he fought in many battles, under Tadayo or his other brother, Ōkubo Tadasuke. Tadataka served with distinction at the Battle of Takatenjin Castle, taking the head of enemy general Okabe Motonobu. He also fought at the siege of Ueda Castle. After the Siege of Odawara, when Tokugawa Ieyasu moved to the Kantō Region, he granted Tadataka land assessed at 3,000 koku, and appointed him yari-bugyō (magistrate of spears) in the Tokugawa main battle camp.

Tadataka also served at Sekigahara and the Siege of Osaka; his service stretched over the careers of the first three Tokugawa shōguns.

Tadataka died at age 80. His graves are in Okazaki, Kyoto, and at Ryūgyō-ji, a temple in Minato, Tokyo.

References
 Japanese Wiki article on Tadataka (21 Sept. 2007)

Further reading

 Bolitho, Harold. (1974). Treasures Among Men: The Fudai Daimyo in Tokugawa Japan. New Haven: Yale University Press.  ;  OCLC 185685588
Tsumoto Yō 津本陽 (2004). Ōkubo Hikozaemon: fufū no toki koso 大久保彦左衛門: 不遇の時こそ. Tokyo: Kōbunsha 光文社.

Ōkubo clan
1560 births
1639 deaths
Hatamoto
People from Okazaki, Aichi